Badamdar is a municipality in Baku, Azerbaijan.  It has a population of 11,871.

The name Badamdar is from Persian Badam, ‘almonds’ and dar, ‘tree’. It is located in Sabail district, to the south of Baku. In Sebail district, there are three municipalities: Badamdar, Sabail, and Bibiheybet. Badamdar settlement (qesebe) is situated in mountainous area. The total area of the municipality constitutes 9700 square meters. Population of the municipality is 21,633. The population works mainly in industrial enterprises and services. There are social facilities and a car market. In recent years, it has become a large residential area of Baku.

Thus, in accordance with the law on status of municipalities, there are 15 elected members 

In 1990, it received the status of a settlement.

References 

Municipalities of Baku